Christine Birak is a Canadian television journalist, currently a health and science reporter for CBC News. She is most noted for winning the Canadian Screen Award for Best National News Reporter at the 9th Canadian Screen Awards in 2021.

An employee of the CBC since the early 2000s, her reportage for The National was especially prominent in 2020 due to the prominence of the COVID-19 pandemic in Canada. She has also appeared on CBC News Network as an anchor of CBC News Now.

References

Canadian television reporters and correspondents
Canadian television news anchors
Canadian women television journalists
Canadian Screen Award winning journalists
Living people
Canadian people of Punjabi descent
Year of birth missing (living people)